The 1980–81 season was Manchester City's 79th season of competitive football and 61st season in the top division of English football. In addition to the First Division, the club competed in the FA Cup and Football League Cup.

First Division

League table

Results summary

References

External links

Manchester City F.C. seasons
Manchester City